Gallitos de Isabela is a professional basketball team based in Isabela, Puerto Rico. They play their home games at the José Abreu Coliseum.

History
In 1984, the Gallitos reached the BSN Finals, during that year known, due to a scandal concerning the eligibility of a Leones de Ponce player named David Ponce to play, as the "Copa Olimpica". They lost to the defending champions, Indios de Canovanas, in six games. This was during the franchise's "golden era", when players like Edwin Pellot and Frankie Torruellas played for the Gallitos. That team was coached by American Phil Jackson, who coached the team from 1984 to 1986, leading them to the playoffs in 1984, 1985 and 1986.

Notable players

  José Abreu
  Mickey Coll
  Edwin Pellot
  Frankie Torruellas

Head coaches
  Flor Meléndez
  Phil Jackson

References

External links
 bsnpr.com - Official site of the Baloncesto Superior Nacional (BSN). 

BSN teams
Basketball teams established in 1969